Rodrigo Gómez may refer to:

 Rodrigo Gómez (Castilian nobleman) (died 1146), Castilian nobleman and military leader
 Rodrigo Gómez de Traba (1201–1260), Galician nobleman
 Rodrigo Gómez (Chilean footballer) (born 1968), Chilean football midfielder
 Rodrigo Gómez (footballer, born 1981), Uruguayan football defender
 Rodrigo Gómez (Argentine footballer) (born 1993), Argentine football midfielder